Brices Creek is an unincorporated area and census-designated place (CDP) in Craven County, North Carolina, United States. The population was 3,073 at the 2010 census. It is part of the New Bern, North Carolina Metropolitan Statistical Area.

Geography
Brices Creek is located in central Craven County at  (35.064014, -77.077485). It is bordered to the north by the tidal Trent River, across which is the town of Trent Woods. The CDP is bordered on the west by Croatan National Forest in Jones County. The waterway of Brices Creek flows across the eastern part of the CDP, into the Trent River.

Demographics

2020 census

As of the 2020 United States census, there were 4,158 people, 1,381 households, and 1,196 families residing in the CDP.

2010 census
The 2010 census reported that there were 3,073 a 49%White alone - 2,692 (87.6%),Black alone - 261 (8.5%), Two or more races 51 (1.7%),Hispanic - 46 (1.5%, Asian alone - 22 (0.7%),American Indian alone - 1 (0.03%.

Population in 2010: 3,073. Population change since 2000: +49.2%, Males: 1,506 	 (49.0%)
Females: 1,567 	 (51.0%), Median resident age: 	 41.9 years
North Carolina median age: 41.9 years
Estimated median household income in 2009: $72,457 (it was $61,182 in 2000)
Brices Creek: $72,457

Estimated median house or condo value in 2009: $280,510 (it was $142,600 in 2000)
Brices Creek:	

Mean prices in 2009: All housing units: $251,342; Detached houses: $259,708; Mobile homes: $47,664

Median gross rent in 2009: $1,293.

2000 census
In 2000, there were 2,060 people, 765 households, and 631 families residing in the CDP. The population density was 259.6 people per square mile (100.2/km2). There were 841 housing units at an average density of 106.0/sq mi (40.9/km2). The racial makeup of the CDP was 87.82% White, 11.31% African American, 0.10% Native American, 0.24% Asian, and 0.53% from two or more races. Hispanic or Latino of any race were 0.73% of the population.

There were 765 households, out of which 37.9% had children under the age of 18 living with them, 77.4% were married couples living together, 3.5% had a female householder with no husband present, and 17.4% were non-families. 14.8% of all households were made up of individuals, and 4.6% had someone living alone who was 65 years of age or older. The average household size was 2.68 and the average family size was 2.98.

In the CDP, the population was spread out, with 26.1% under the age of 18, 4.7% from 18 to 24, 27.8% from 25 to 44, 31.3% from 45 to 64, and 10.1% who were 65 years of age or older. The median age was 41 years. For every 100 females, there were 99.6 males. For every 100 females age 18 and over, there were 99.2 males.

The median income for a household in the CDP was $61,182, and the median income for a family was $65,833. Males had a median income of $51,347 versus $26,554 for females. The per capita income for the CDP was $22,115. None of the families and 0.9% of the population were living below the poverty line, including no under eighteens and 10.0% of those over 64.

References

Census-designated places in Craven County, North Carolina
Census-designated places in North Carolina
New Bern micropolitan area